Natalya Vassilievna Smirnitskaya (née Dyatlova; 8 September 1927 – 2004) was a Soviet track and field athlete who competed in the javelin throw. She broke the women's javelin throw world record twice in 1949, becoming the first Soviet woman to do so and the first woman to throw beyond fifty metres for the event.

Smirnitskaya was the gold medallist at the 1950 European Athletics Championships and also the 1949 World Festival of Youth and Students. She was a two-time national champion, winning in 1949 and 1950.

Career

Early life
Born in Ordzhonikidze (now Vladikavkaz) and raised in Pyatigorsk, at the age of fourteen she met Viktor Alexeyev – a national champion in javelin throwing – who had been evacuated there due to World War II. After the end of the war, she later moved to Leningrad and began training with him. Smirnitskaya was the first of Alexeyev's charges to achieve international success and he went on to train many other athletes, including Olympic shot put champions Galina Zybina and Tamara Tyshkevich. She joined Zenit, the sports club associated with the Soviet arms industry.

Smirnitskaya established herself at national level in 1947, with a runner-up finish behind Klavdiya Mayuchaya at the Soviet Athletics Championships. She was again runner-up the following year, this time behind Aleksandra Chudina.

International success
She rose to prominence in the 1949 season. This marked the first time that a Soviet woman had ever broken that record. Her efforts coincided with a period of Soviet success in the women's throws, as Tatyana Sevryukova and Nina Dumbadze had broken the shot put and discus world records the previous year – both being the first Soviets to have that honour.

Smirnitskaya won her first ever national title in the sport that year, throwing the spear . This started off a streak of Soviet success at the competition, as a Soviet woman was the winner at each edition until its dissolution in 1962. She retained her national title in 1950 with a throw of  – this was the second best performance in the world that year. The 1950 European Athletics Championships was her first open class, top level competition and she demonstrated her position as the world's best thrower by winning with three metres to spare over minor medallists Herma Bauma and Galina Zybina.

Decline and retirement
Smirtnitskaya did not retain her position at the top of the sport in the 1951. First she was defeated by Vera Nabokova at the Soviet Championships.

Smirnitskaya had a child in 1952 and did not reach the same levels of the sport after that point. After that year she did not throw beyond 50 metres or rank in the top ten globally. Her world record stood from 5 August 1949 until 5 February 1954, when fellow Soviet Nadezhda Konyayeva added an additional fifteen centimetres. She went on to attend the Lesgaft National State University of Physical Education, Sport and Health and was awarded the USSR Honored Master of Sports in 1957. She was an athletics coach at the Zenit club from 1955 to 1965, then later in her life became a secondary school teacher at High School 161 in Leningrad (later Saint Petersburg).

National titles
Soviet Athletics Championships
Javelin throw: 1949, 1950

International competitions

See also
List of European Athletics Championships medalists (women)

References

1927 births
2004 deaths
People from Pyatigorsk
Sportspeople from Vladikavkaz
Soviet female javelin throwers
Soviet sports coaches
European Athletics Championships medalists
World record setters in athletics (track and field)
Sportspeople from Stavropol Krai